Otaya (also spelled Utaya) is a Syrian village located in Markaz Rif Dimashq, Douma District. Autaya had a population of 3,720 in the 2004 census.

References

Populated places in Markaz Rif Dimashq District